Příběh kriminálního rady is a Czech novel by Ladislav Fuks. It was first published in 1971.

1971 Czech novels
Psychological thriller novels